Maloisane Ramasimong (born 10 May 1990) is a South African soccer player who plays as a midfielder for South African Premier Division side Chippa United.

Club career
He played for Bloemfontein Celtic at youth level.

He joined Bantu in 2016, and was the Lesotho Premier League's player of the season for the 2017–18 campaign. He left Bantu in 2018 to join Bloemfontein Celtic on a two-year deal.

He joined Chippa United in September 2020.

References

Living people
1990 births
South African soccer players
Association football midfielders
Bantu FC players
Bloemfontein Celtic F.C. players
Chippa United F.C. players
South African Premier Division players
South African expatriate soccer players
South African expatriate sportspeople in Lesotho
Expatriate footballers in Lesotho